"Find Me a Home" is a song by British singer and songwriter Natalie Duncan released from her debut album Devil In Me and featured in Find Me a Home EP. The single was released on 14 September 2012 as a digital download.

Music video

A video to accompany the release of the song was uploaded to YouTube on 24 September 2012. Directed by Joe Elliott, it was filmed in and around London. The plot of the video revolves around a man searching for Natalie and Natalie driving around London.

From MOBO: "The track is set for release on October 29th, and the video tells a tense tale of two journeys that seemingly come together. It's a dark thriller set in the rich, pulsing life of London at night, as a sinister figure closes in on Natalie Duncan. As Duncan's rich and fluid voice cracks, it's hard to not be fully taken into her world – she sings of "devils, cracks and dishevelled", and as the track unfolds it's clear she possesses the vocal power to break the hearts of thousands."

Track listings

Digital download

 "Find Me a Home" – 4:22 	
 "Find Me a Home"  – 3:29
 "Sky Is Falling"  – 5:25
 "At Last"  – 3:00

References

External links
 Official web site

2012 songs
Songs written by Jimmy Hogarth
Verve Records singles